Artashen may refer to:
 Aratashen, Armenia
 Hartashen, Shirak, Armenia
 Hartashen, Syunik, Armenia
 Ardeşen, Turkey